The 2016 Omaha Beef season was the team's seventeenth and second as a member of Champions Indoor Football (CIF). One of 12 teams in the CIF for the 2016 season, they played in the 6-team Northern Division.

The Beef played their home games at the Ralston Arena in Ralston, Nebraska, under the direction of head coach Cory Ross.

Schedule
Key:

Preseason season

Regular season

Standings

Roster

References

External links
 Omaha Beef official site

Sports in Omaha, Nebraska
Omaha Beef
Omaha Beef seasons
2016 in sports in Nebraska